The Latin Cup (or Copa Latina) was an international basketball tournament for club sides from the Latin European nations of France, Italy, Spain, and from Switzerland or Portugal, in a similar way than the Latin Cup of football.

The basketball tournament did not start until 1953, being the immediate precedent of the precursor competition of the European Cup organized by FIBA in the 1957-58 season. The competition was organized by the Commission of International Organizations of Basketball - an organization belonging to the maximum basketball estate of the FIBA-, jointly with the national federations of the participating clubs.

In spite of the football precedent and the success, Latin Cup had only two editions. After the first celebrated the same year of its establishment, the second one took place on the occasion of the second edition of a competition sponsored by the FIBA and later named the International Christmas Tournament. It was decided that this second edition would be recognized as the second Latin Cup due to the origin of the participants, and in an attempt to relaunch the competition, held in December 1966 in the Pabellón de la Ciudad Deportiva del Real Madrid.

A tournament in America has been held since 1989  (organized in Panama by the Panamanian Basketball Federation, FEPABA), being a competition between national basketball teams also called Copa Latina.

Results

Titles by club

Titles by nation

References

 
Defunct basketball cup competitions in Europe
International club basketball competitions
Recurring sporting events established in 1953
1953 establishments in Europe
Recurring sporting events disestablished in 1966
1966 disestablishments in Europe